Janez Potočnik (pronounced ; born 22 March 1958) is a Slovenian politician who served as European Commissioner for Environment from 2009 until 2014. He was formerly Slovenia's Minister for European Affairs. 
In November 2014, he became co-chair of the International Resource Panel (IRP), a forum of scientists and experts working on natural resources management.

Biography
Janez Potočnik was born on 22 March 1958 in Kropa, SR Slovenia. His father Stojan was innkeeper and his mother Lojzka was a school teacher. He has one sibling, a brother seven years older named Lojz. After finishing elementary school in Lipnica, Potočnik attended high school in Kranj, where he was also active in sports, notably in basketball and track and field. After high school he moved to Ljubljana, where he received a bachelor's degree in economics from the University of Ljubljana in 1982.

Early career
Potočnik served as assistant director (1984–1987) and director (1993–2001) at the Institute of Macroeconomic Analysis and Development in Ljubljana. In 1993, he received his PhD in economics from the University of Ljubljana. Between 1988 and 1993, he was a senior researcher at the Institute for Economic Research in Ljubljana.

Political career
Potočnik was Minister Councillor at the Slovenian Prime Minister's Cabinet from 2001 to 2002 and Minister for European Affairs from 2002 to 2004. He headed the negotiating team for the Accession of Slovenia to the EU between 1998 and 2004.

In 2004 Potočnik became European Commissioner, since November responsible for science and research. On 27 November 2009 he was nominated to serve as European Commissioner for the Environment in the Barroso Commission.

While commissioner, Potočnik stated that he believes trading knowledge and the development of an information society to create prosperity is as important to Europe as trading steel and coal to create peace was 50 years ago. He aimed to develop the European Research Area.

Later career
Since 2014, Potočnik has been co-chairing – alongside Alicia Bárcena (2014-2017) and Izabella Teixeira (since 2017) – the International Resource Panel at the United Nations Environment Programme (UNEP); he succeeded Ernst Ulrich von Weizsäcker in that position. In 2020, he served on the advisory board of the annual Human Development Report of the United Nations Development Programme (UNDP), co-chaired by Tharman Shanmugaratnam and Michael Spence. Since July 2020, he has also been serving as a special advisor on sustainability to European Commissioner for the Environment & Oceans and Fisheries Virginijus Sinkevičius. 

Additional roles include: 
 ThinkForest Forum, President (since 2019)
 SytemiQ, Partner 
 SDG multi-stakeholder platform, hosted by European Commission, Member 
 Forum for the Future of Agriculture, Chairman (since 2014)
 Rural Investment Support for Europe (RISE) Foundation, Chairman (since 2014)
 Critical Ecosystem Partnership Fund (CEPF), President of the long-term vision for the Balkans sub-region of the Mediterranean Biodiversity Hotspot
 'A vision for Europe towards sustainable and circular economy', Member of the Steering Committee

Recognition

Honorary degrees
 2008 – Honorary doctorate in science from Imperial College London
 2009 – Honorary doctorate from Ghent University
 2016 – Honorary doctorate in Economics and Business Administration from Aalto University

Awards
 2011 – Fray International Sustainability Award, awarded by the Fray International Symposium
 2013 – Champions of the Earth, awarded by the United Nations Environment Programme
 2014 – ACER Award, awarded by the Catalan Association of Research Entities
 2014 – Twelve Stars for the Environment Award, awarded by the European Environmental Bureau (EEB)
 2015 – Personality Trophy at the Circular Economy Competition, awarded by the Institute of Circular Economy in Paris
 2015 – Hans-Carl-Von-Carlowitz Prize, awarded by Carlowitz company
 2015 – Adam Smith Prize for Environmental Economic Policy, awarded by the Green Budget Germany

See also
EU Directorate General Research
EU Directorate General Joint Research Centre

References

External links

Official Media Gallery
Official website
Janez Potočnik's blog

|-

|-

|-

1958 births
Living people
Liberal Democracy of Slovenia politicians
20th-century Slovenian economists
Slovenian European Commissioners
University of Ljubljana alumni
People from the Municipality of Radovljica
Yugoslav economists
21st-century Slovenian  economists